Evrensel is a Turkish daily newspaper.

History and profile
Evrensel was founded on 7 June 1995. The issues captured and written are from a socialist perspective. The paper is different from other Turkish newspapers in that it presents an in-depth research into issues surrounding the workers unions. In 2017, newspaper started an English version of news.

Incidents
Metin Göktepe, the 27-year-old journalist whose death in police custody in 1996 caused public protests and outcry, was on duty as a reporter for Evrensel on the day of his detention and murder.

References

1995 establishments in Turkey
Daily newspapers published in Turkey
Newspapers established in 1995
Turkish-language newspapers